USS Warrior (MCM-10) is an  of the United States Navy.

The Avenger-class ships were designed to have very low acoustic and magnetic signatures to avoid detonating mines. While most modern warships have steel hulls, the Avengers have wooden hulls with an external coating of fiberglass. They are equipped with sophisticated minehunting and classification sonar as well as remotely operated mine neutralization and disposal systems.

Service history
Warrior was laid down on 25 September 1989 at Peterson Builders in Sturgeon Bay, Wisconsin. She was launched on 8 December 1990, and was commissioned on 3 April 1993.

On 7 August 1998, Warrior rescued four men from a sinking boat off the coast of Charleston, South Carolina. "We were in the right place at the right time," said Chief Boatswain's Mate (SW) John Valdez.

In June 2005, Warrior, along with four other mine countermeasure ships, participated in a mine warfare exercise off the coast of Florida.

On 26 February 2013, 7th Fleet announced that Warrior would be transferred from 5th Fleet in Bahrain to 7th Fleet in Sasebo, Japan to replace , which had recently been decommissioned after running aground in the Philippines.

Awards and accomplishments
Won the 2004 Safety Excellence Award in the Mine Warfare Ship category
Reported no personnel injured or dead or property damages during training exercises and scheduled deployment tasks
Won Award Battle E for excellence in 1995, 2001, 2003, 2005, 2017, and 2019.
Received Meritorious Unit Commendation for action in Exercise BLUE HARRIER, 1995

See also
Current United States Navy ships
List of mine warfare vessels of the United States Navy

Notes

External links
 Official page

References
 NavSource Online: Mine Warfare Ship Photo Archive MCM-10 Warrior
United States Navy Fact File: Mine Countermeasures Ships (MCM)

 

Avenger-class mine countermeasures ships
Minehunters of the United States
1990 ships
Ships built by Peterson Builders